Berta is a genus of moths in the family Geometridae.

Species
 Berta albiplaga Warren, 1893
 Berta annulifera Warren, 1896
 Berta anteplaga Prout, 1916
 Berta cercifera Holloway, 1996
 Berta chrysolineata Walker, [1863]
 Berta copiosa Prout, 1917
 Berta digitijuxta Holloway, 1996
 Berta hemisponsa Prout
 Berta philippina Prout, 1917
 Berta subrectistriga Prout
 Berta tridentijuxta Holloway, 1996
 Berta vaga (Walker, 1861)
 Berta zygophyxia Prout, 1912

References
 Berta at Markku Savela's Lepidoptera and Some Other Life Forms
 Natural History Museum Lepidoptera genus database

Hemitheini